Constituent Assembly elections were held in Ecuador on 30 September 2007. A Constituent Assembly was established following an April referendum on doing so. A total of 130 delegates were elected; 24 members from national lists, 100 elected from provincial constituencies and six for overseas votes.

The large number of candidates and lists (26 national lists, 428 provincial lists, 44 emigrant lists) caused the elections to be the most complex in Ecuador's history. Although polls indicated that Correa's PAIS Alliance would win a plurality in the election, but not a majority, PAIS won a landslide victory, winning 80 of the 130 seats, giving the party the power to dismiss Congress and make the substantial constitutional reforms for which Correa has been calling. PAIS won all six foreign seats.

The Constituent Assembly was to be set up on 31 October 2007 and have six months (with a possible extension of two months) to draft a new constitution, which will then have to be ratified in a referendum. However, the installation of the Assembly was delayed to 29 November 2007 due to delays in the official proclamation of the final result.

Results

References

Ecuador
Constituent Assembly election
Elections in Ecuador